Stellatospora is a genus of fungi within the Sordariaceae family. This is a monotypic genus, containing the single species Stellatospora terricola, isolated from paddy soil in Japan.

References

External links
Stellatospora at Index Fungorum

Sordariales
Monotypic Sordariomycetes genera